The Fuldaer Geschichtsblätter is the official publication of the Fuldaer Geschichtsverein, the historical society of the German city of Fulda in Hesse, founded 1896. The magazine is published since 1912, for a while as a monthly supplement to the Fuldaer Zeitung, later irregularly. Publication was interrupted from 1915 to 1919 and from 1939 to 1953, and has continued since then.

Common abbreviations are FGBl. and FdGbll.

External links
 
 Digital archive

History magazines
Irregularly published magazines published in Germany
German-language magazines
Magazines established in 1912
Mass media in Fulda
Newspaper supplements
1912 establishments in Germany
Monthly magazines published in Germany